Smaragdia is a genus of small sea snails, marine gastropod mollusks in the subfamily Neritinae of the family Neritidae, the nerites.

Species
Species within the genus Smaragdia include:
 Smaragdia bryanae (Pilsbry, 1918)
 † Smaragdia expansa (Reuss in M. Hörnes, 1856) 
 † Smaragdia merignacensis (Cossmann & Peyrot, 1918) 
 Smaragdia patburkeae Eichhorst, 2016
 Smaragdia pulcherrima (Angas, 1871)
 Smaragdia purpureomaculata Dekker, 2000
 Smaragdia rangiana (Recluz, 1841)
 Smaragdia roseopicta Thiele, 1930
 Smaragdia souverbiana (Montrouzier, 1863)
 Smaragdia tragena (Iredale, 1936) - synonym: Smaragdia abakionigraphis Drivas & Jay, 1989
 Smaragdia viridis (Linnaeus, 1758)
Synonyms
 Smaragdia abakionigraphis Drivas & Jay, 1989: synonym of Smaragdia tragena (Iredale, 1936)
 Smaragdia feuilleti (Audouin, 1826) - type species: synonym of Smaragdia viridis (Linnaeus, 1758)
 Smaragdia paulucciana (Gassies, 1870)<: synonym of Clithon parvulum (Le Guillou, 1841)
 Smaragdia viridemaris Mauri, 1917: synonym of Smaragdia viridis (Linnaeus, 1758) (dubious synonym)

References

Further reading 
 Vaught, K.C. (1989). A classification of the living Mollusca. American Malacologists: Melbourne, FL (USA). . XII, 195 pp
 Gofas, S.; Le Renard, J.; Bouchet, P. (2001). Mollusca, in: Costello, M.J. et al. (Ed.) (2001). European register of marine species: a check-list of the marine species in Europe and a bibliography of guides to their identification. Collection Patrimoines Naturels, 50: pp. 180–213
 Rolán E., 2005. Malacological Fauna From The Cape Verde Archipelago. Part 1, Polyplacophora and Gastropoda
 Eichhorst T.E. (2016). Neritidae of the world. Volume 2. Harxheim: Conchbooks. Pp. 696-1366

External links
 Issel, A. (1869). Malacologia del Mar Rosso. Ricerche zoologiche e paleontologiche. Biblioteca Malacologica, Pisa. xi + 387 pp., pls 1-5
 Iredale, T. (1936). Australian molluscan notes, no. 2. Records of the Australian Museum. 19(5): 267-340, pls 20-24

Neritidae